David Milne Beggs (December 4, 1872 – August 11, 1924) was an American football player and coach. He served as a player-coach at Mercer University in 1891.

Beggsgraduated from Washington and Lee University in Lexington, Virginia in 1891, where he was also a member of the football team. Although he was not a registered student at Mercer, he was allowed to play as a member of its team. He played against the Georgia Bulldogs in the first game in their program's history.

Head coaching record

References

1872 births
1924 deaths
19th-century players of American football
American football fullbacks
Player-coaches
Mercer Bears football coaches
Mercer Bears football players
Washington and Lee Generals football players
Sportspeople from Macon, Georgia